The Birchs Inlet, also spelt Birch's Inlet or Birches Inlet, is a narrow cove or coastal inlet on the south-western side of Macquarie Harbour on the west coast of Tasmania, Australia. The inlet is located within the Southwest National Park, part of the Tasmanian Wilderness World Heritage Area.

Features and location
About  in length, the mouth of the inlet lies near the head of Macquarie Harbour not far from the mouth of the Gordon River. It is only accessible by water transport. It has been at times an important access point for loggers working in the area for moving Huon Pine to Strahan.

It lies at the northern end of the Melaleuca to Birchs Inlet Important Bird Area.  It is one of only two (the other being at Melaleuca) study sites for orange-bellied parrots in their breeding range.

Etymology
It is named after Thomas William Birch (1774-1821), a surgeon, whaler, merchant and shipowner who settled in Tasmania in 1808.

References

Bays of Tasmania
Important Bird Areas of Tasmania
Inlets of Australia
Macquarie Harbour